Darbal (also spelled Drubal or Dirbul) is a Syrian village in the Qatana District of the Rif Dimashq Governorate. According to the Syria Central Bureau of Statistics (CBS), Darbal had a population of 2,049 in the 2004 census. Its inhabitants are predominantly Muslims.

History
In 1838, Eli Smith noted Darbal's population as predominantly Sunni Muslim.

References

Bibliography

 

Druze communities in Syria
Populated places in Qatana District